Kim Hyung-tae may refer to:

 Kim Hyung-tae (video game artist)
 Kim Hyung-tae (figure skater) (born 1997), South Korean pair skater